The Soil and Water Environmental Enhancement Program (SWEEP_, was a Canadian agricultural program administered by Agriculture and Agri-Food Canada, and carried out by the province of Ontario. Designed to examine the effects of tillage on many types of soil, the program ran from 1986 through 1988. The impetus for the program was the Canada-U.S. Great Lakes Water Quality Agreement, calling for a reduction in phosphorus pollution in the Lake Erie basin of 2000 tonnes per year. Canada agreed to reduce phosphorus run-off by 300 tonnes per year—200 from agricultural cropland sources and 100 from industrial and municipal sources by 1990.

External links
 https://wayback.archive-it.org/10225/20190221203835/http://agrienvarchive.ca/sweep/sweephom.html
See related Ontario Agri-Environmental Archive: https://atrium.lib.uoguelph.ca/xmlui/handle/10214/13065
  (Archive Reports now hosted by Univ. of Guelph Library (Atrium). 
See Related Clean Up Rural Beaches (C.U.R.B.) Program (1991–1996): https://wayback.archive-it.org/10225/20190221195141/http://agrienvarchive.ca/curb/curb.html
See Related: PLUARG (Pollution from Land Use Activities Reference Group, International Joint Commission on the Great Lakes Basin)(1972–1979):
https://wayback.archive-it.org/10225/20190221195137/http://agrienvarchive.ca/pluarg/pluarg.html (more than 80 PDF reports available)
See related ManureNet Canada site at: https://wayback.archive-it.org/10225/20190221162351/http://agrienvarchive.ca/bioenergy/manurenet.html

Agriculture in Canada